Adelmann (?,  - c. 1061, Brescia) was the bishop of Brescia, in Northern Italy, during the eleventh century. Adelmann seems to have become bishop there in 1050, and to have taken an active share in the church-reform movement of the period, especially against the clerical abuses of simony and concubinage.

Of unknown parentage and nationality, he was educated at the famous School of Chartres, in France, founded by Fulbert, and was considered one of his favourite scholars. Among his fellow students was Berengarius, to whom, at a later period, he addressed two letters. The second (incomplete) letter  is a valuable dogmatic exposition of the teaching of the Church on the Eucharist; the Benedictine editors of the Histoire littéraire de la France call it "one of the finest literary documents of the period." It breathes a tender affection for Berengarius, the friend of the writer's youth.

Calvin called him "barbarus, imperitus, et sophista."

Notes

External links 
 

Year of birth unknown
1061 deaths
11th-century Italian Roman Catholic bishops
Bishops of Brescia
Prince-Bishopric of Liège clergy
11th-century people of the Holy Roman Empire